Haines Chapel, together with the South Mountain Cemetery, is a historic property located near the Blue Ridge Parkway in Rockbridge and Nelson Counties in the U.S. state of Virginia.  The site is located just west of the parkway and north of Virginia Route 56 (Tye River Turnpike).  The cemetery apparently began as a family cemetery in the 18th century; its oldest dated grave marker is a modern one dated 1793, although the oldest legible stone gives a date of 1857.  The chapel, a simple wood-frame building constructed in 1914, stands on the Nelson County side of the property.  Its interior contains well-preserved period woodwork, and is largely in original condition, including a period piano and organ.  It is still used occasionally for services and special occasions, and the cemetery is also open to new burials.

The church and cemetery were listed on the National Register of Historic Places in 2014.

See also
National Register of Historic Places listings in Rockbridge County, Virginia
National Register of Historic Places listings in Nelson County, Virginia

References

Churches completed in 1914
Properties of religious function on the National Register of Historic Places in Virginia
Buildings and structures in Rockbridge County, Virginia
Buildings and structures in Nelson County, Virginia
National Register of Historic Places in Rockbridge County, Virginia
National Register of Historic Places in Nelson County, Virginia
Methodist churches in Virginia
Former Methodist church buildings in the United States
Cemeteries in Virginia
Wooden churches in the United States